Stuart Anthony Thurgood (born 4 November 1981) is an English former professional footballer.  He played professionally for clubs including Southend United and Gillingham.  In 2021 he was convicted of drugs smuggling offences and sentenced to eight years in prison.

Career
Born in Enfield, London, Thurgood made his debut for Gillingham in the 2–1 home win over Hartlepool United on 24 November 2007. He signed for Gillingham on a permanent basis in January 2008, keeping him at the club until 2009.

Thurgood rejoined Grays Athletic on 13 March 2008 on loan until the end of the 2007–08 season. He signed for Grays for a third time on 19 August 2008, on loan until the end of the 2008–09 season. This was cut short though when he was released by Gillingham on 23 January 2009, at which point he joined Grays permanently again until the end of the season. After the end of the season, in May, he joined League Two team Dagenham & Redbridge on a two-year contract.

During November 2009 he sustained an injury which eventually forced him to retire, aged just 28.

However, after a successful period with playing for Grays Athletic's reserve team, Thurgood signed for the Isthmian League Division One club on 11 October 2011.

In November 2011, Thurgood signed for Conference South club Thurrock, and returned for another spell in March 2017.

Imprisonment
In 2021, Thurgood was sentenced to eight years in prison for drugs smuggling offences.  He was a member of an organised crime group which smuggled cocaine into the United Kingdom and distributed it to county lines gangs in Essex and surrounding areas.

Honours
FA Trophy: 2005, 2006
Conference South (VI): 2005

References

External links
Stuart Thurgood player profile at gillinghamfootballclub.com

1981 births
Living people
Footballers from Enfield, London
English footballers
Player-coaches
England semi-pro international footballers
English expatriate footballers
Expatriate footballers in Japan
Association football midfielders
Tottenham Hotspur F.C. players
Shimizu S-Pulse players
Southend United F.C. players
Grays Athletic F.C. players
Gillingham F.C. players
Dagenham & Redbridge F.C. players
Thurrock F.C. players
East Thurrock United F.C. players
VCD Athletic F.C. players
English Football League players
National League (English football) players
Isthmian League players
J1 League players
English expatriate sportspeople in Japan